Benjamin W. Diederich was a member of the Wisconsin State Assembly.

Biography
Diederich was born on September 22, 1903, in Manitowoc, Wisconsin. He attended the University of Wisconsin Law School. He died in Sheboygan, Wisconsin on October 12, 1974, aged 71.

Career
Diederich was a member of the Assembly from 1939 to 1940. He was a Republican.

References

People from Manitowoc, Wisconsin
Republican Party members of the Wisconsin State Assembly
University of Wisconsin Law School alumni
1903 births
Place of death missing
1974 deaths
20th-century American politicians